Christoforos Merousis (born 22 March 1982) is a Greek long distance runner who specialises in the marathon. He competed in the men's marathon event at the 2016 Summer Olympics. He finished in 116th place with a time of 2:29:39.

Christoforos Merousis is the only Greek Athlete that has won the Greek Championship of the Athens_Classic_Marathon 4 consecutive years in a row, from 2013 to 2016.

Competition record

References

External links
 

1982 births
Living people
Greek male long-distance runners
Greek male marathon runners
Athletes (track and field) at the 2016 Summer Olympics
Olympic athletes of Greece
Athletes (track and field) at the 2009 Mediterranean Games
Mediterranean Games competitors for Greece
People from Chios
21st-century Greek people